Linda Castillo is an American author of novels including the New York Times and USA Today bestselling Kate Burkholder series, which are crime thrillers set in Amish country. The first book, Sworn to Silence, was adapted into a Lifetime original movie titled An Amish Murder starring Neve Campbell. She has also written numerous romance and romantic suspense novels. Castillo grew up in Arcanum, Ohio and now lives in Texas with her husband.

Awards and honors
Castillo is the recipient of the Daphne du Maurier Award and the Holt Medallion. She has been nominated for the RITA, for the Mystery Writers of America's Sue Grafton Memorial Award, and for the International Thriller Writers' award for Best Hardcover.

Bibliography

Kate Burkholder series
 Sworn to Silence, Minotaur Books, 2009, 
 Pray for Silence, Minotaur Books, 2010,  / 
 Breaking Silence, Minotaur Books, 2011, 
 Gone missing, Minotaur Books, 2012, 
 Her Last Breath, Minotaur Books, 2013, 
 The Dead Will Tell, Minotaur Books, 2014, 
 After the Storm, Minotaur Books, 2015, 
 Among the Wicked, Minotaur Books, 2016, 
 Down a Dark Road, Minotaur Books, 2017, 
 A Gathering of Secrets, Minotaur Books, 2018,  
Shamed, Minotaur Books, 2019, 
Outsider, Minotaur Books, 2020, 
Fallen, Minotaur Books, 2021, ISBN 9781250142924
The Hidden One, Minotaur Books, 2022, ISBN 9781250781055

Kate Burkholder Short Stories 

Collected in A Simple Murder, Minotaur Books, 2021, 
Long Lost, Minotaur Books, 2013, 
A Hidden Secret, Minotaur Books, 2015, 
Seeds of Deception, Minotaur Books, 2016, 
Only the Lucky, Minotaur Books, 2017, 
In Dark Company, Minotaur Books, 2018, 
In Plain Sight, Minotaur Books, 2019, 
The Pact, Minotaur Books, 2020, 
Disappeared, Minotaur Books, 2021, ISBN 9781250824554
Blood Moon, Minotaur Books, 2022, ISBN 9781250871909

Other books
 Remember the Night (Men in Blue), Silhouette, 2000, 
 Cops and … Lovers?, Silhouette, 2001,  / 
 Hero to Hold, Silhouette, 2001, 
 Just a Little Bit Dangerous, Silhouette, 2002, 
 The Perfect Victim, Jove Books, 2002,  
 A Cry in the Night, Harlequin, 2003,  
 Midnight Run, Silhouette, 2003, 
 The Phoenix Encounter, Silhouette, 2003, 
 The Shadow Side, Berkley, 2003, 
 Uncharted Waters, Harlequin, 2003,  
 Fade to Red, Berkley, 2004, 
 Dead Reckoning, Berkley Sensation, 2005, 
 Depth Perception, Berkley, 2005,  
 Operation: Midnight Cowboy, Harlequin, 2005, 
 Operation: Midnight Escape, Harlequin, 2005, 
 Operation: Midnight Tango, Harlequin, 2005, 
 Operation: Midnight Guardian, Harlequin, 2006, 
 Operation: Midnight Rendezvous, Harlequin, 2006, 
 A Whisper in the Dark, Berkley Sensation, 2006, 
 A Baby Before Dawn, Harlequin, 2007, 
 In the Dead of the Night, Harlequin, 2007, 
 Overkill, Berkley Trade, 2007,

References

20th-century American novelists
Living people
Novelists from Ohio
Novelists from Texas
21st-century American novelists
American thriller writers
Place of birth missing (living people)
Year of birth missing (living people)
American women novelists
20th-century American women writers
21st-century American women writers
Women thriller writers